Ashis Marjit is an Indian politician from All India Trinamool Congress. In May 2021, he was elected as the member of the West Bengal Legislative Assembly from Khargram (Vidhan Sabha constituency)

Early life and education
Marjit is from Khargram, Murshidabad. His father's name is Sambhunath Marjit. He has passed H.S from H.S.Gurapasla S.K.Siksha Niketan in 1992.

Career
He has been elected as the member of the West Bengal Legislative Assembly from Khargram (Vidhan Sabha constituency). He has won the election.

References 

Trinamool Congress politicians from West Bengal
West Bengal MLAs 2021–2026
People from Murshidabad district
Living people
Year of birth missing (living people)